The BRM P126 was a Formula One racing car which raced in the 1968 and 1969 Formula One seasons. It was powered by a 3.0-litre V12 engine. Design was contracted out to former Lotus and Eagle designer Len Terry and the three examples built were constructed by his Transatlantic Automotive Consultants company due to pressure of work at BRM.

Owen Racing Organisation
The Owen Racing Organisation entered Pedro Rodríguez in the South African Grand Prix, He qualified 10th and retired with a fuel system failure. The team hired Richard Attwood to drive six races. The first event Attwood competed at was Monaco, he qualified sixth and finished second. At the Belgian Grand Prix Attwood qualified 18th and retired with a broken oil pipe. At Holland, he qualified 15th and finished seventh. The French Grand Prix saw the Englishman qualify 12th and finish 7th. At Britain, Attwood qualified 15th and retired with a broken radiator. At the German Grand Prix he qualified 20th and finished 14th. Atwood was replaced by Bobby Unser for the Italian Grand Prix who set a fast time in the early qualifying session. It had been Unser's intention to fly back to the United States for the Hoosier Hundred, at Indiana State Fair grounds, the following day and then return to Milan and race in the Grand Prix. The event organisers announced that if he returned to the United States and race, he would be banned from competing in the Grand Prix, under a ruling which forbade drivers to complete in another event within 24 hours of the start of the Grand Prix. So Unser flew back to the US and did not return. The Owen Racing Organisation thereafter, concentrated their efforts on the BRM P133.

Reg Parnell Racing
Reg Parnell Racing entered Piers Courage in the Spanish Grand Prix. He qualified 11th and retired with fuel pump failure. At Monaco Courage qualified 11th and retired with a chassis problem. The Belgian Grand Prix saw the Englishman qualify 7th and retire when his engine blew. At Holland, Courage qualified 14th and retired when he spun off. At the French Grand Prix the Englishman qualified 14th and finished 6th. At Britain, Courage qualified 16th and finished 8th. The German Grand Prix saw the Englishman qualify 8th and finish 8th. At Italy Courage qualified 17th and finished 4th. The Canadian Grand Prix saw the Englishman qualify 14th and retire with a broken gearbox. At the United States, Courage qualified 14th and retired when he ran out of fuel. The Mexican Grand Prix saw the Englishman qualify 19th and retire when his engine blew. Courage left at the end of the year to drive a Brabham entered by Frank Williams. The Team hired Pedro Rodríguez for 1969 but he only took part in three races. In the South African Grand Prix the Mexican qualified 15th and retired with a water leak. At the Spanish Grand Prix he qualified 14th and retired when his engine blew, At Monaco the Mexican qualified 14th and retired when his engine blew.

Formula One World Championship results
(key)(results in bold indicate pole position, results in italics indicate fastest lap)

‡ Points scored by P138 and P139 chassis† Points scored by P133 chassis

Non-Championship Formula One results
(key)(results in bold indicate pole position, results in italics indicate fastest lap)

References

BRM Formula One cars
1968 Formula One season cars
1969 Formula One season cars
Tasman Series cars